Enefit Green AS is a publicly traded renewable energy company located in Tallinn, Estonia. It went public on Nasdaq Tallinn in October 2021 with 23 % of shares, the rest being owned by the state-owned energy company Eesti Energia. CEO of the company is Aavo Kärmas.

Enefit Green was established in 2016 based on the renewable energy assets of Eesti Energia. The name of Enefit Green was adopted at the end of 2017. In 2018, Enefit Green installed at the remote off-the-grid Ruhnu island an hybrid power generation system, which includes a solar farm, a wind turbine, and battery for energy storage, backed-up with a diesel generator running on biodiesel.  Also in 2018, Enefit Green acquired renewable energy producer Nelja Energia which became a subsidiary of Enefit Green.

Enefit Green owns four wind farms (Paldiski, Narva, Aulepa, Virtsu), Iru waste-to-energy plant, Paide and Valka biomass power plants, Keila-Joa hydroelectric power plant, and Ruhnu hybrid power generation. In addition, its subsidiary Nelja Energia owns eleven wind farms in Estonia and four wind farms in Lithuania, two biogas-fuelled co-generation plants in Estonia, a co-generation plant and pellet factory in Latvia, and it plans a 700–1,100 MW offshore wind farm off Hiiumaa, Estonia. In 2018, Enefit Green concluded an agreement with Finnish Metsähallitus, that grants the right to Enefit Green to develop a 100 MW wind farm in Tolpanvaara, North Ostrobothnia in Finland.  Enefit Green also plans several solar plants with a total capacity of 7 MW.

Enefit Green shares have been listed on the main list of the Tallinn Stock Exchange since October 21, 2021 and can be traded on the Nasdaq Baltic Stock Exchange. The stock's trading symbol is EGR1T. The ISIN code of the share is EE3100137985. Enefit Green has 264,276,232 shares listed. As of December 31, 2021, Enefit Green had 58,771 shareholders. 15% of the shares are owned by retail investors.

See also 
 Energy in Estonia

References

External links 
 

Electric power companies of Estonia
Wind power companies
Solar energy companies
Wind power in Estonia
Energy companies established in 2016
Estonian companies established in 2016